The 2002 Maine gubernatorial election took place on November 5, 2002. Incumbent Independent Governor Angus King was term limited, and unable to seek re-election. U.S. Congressman John Baldacci won the Democratic primary uncontested, while former State Representative Peter Cianchette emerged from the Republican primary victorious. Baldacci and Cianchetti squared off in the general election, along with Green Party nominee Jonathan Carter and independent State Representative John Michael. Ultimately, Baldacci prevailed to win what would be his first of two terms as governor. John Baldacci's win breaks a 20 year gubernatorial losing streak for Maine Democrats.

Democratic primary

Candidates
John Baldacci, U.S. Representative from Maine's 2nd congressional district

Results

Republican primary

Candidates
Peter Cianchette, former State Representative
James D. Libby, former State Senator

Results

Green Party primary

Candidates
Jonathan Carter, nominee for governor in 1994
 Steven Farsaci, minister (dropped out of the race after failing to collect the mandatory 2,000 Green Independent signatures)

Results

General election

Candidates
John Baldacci (D), U.S. Representative
Peter Cianchette (R), former state representative
Jonathan Carter (G), nominee for governor in 1994
John Michael (I), state representative

Predictions

Results

References

External links
Official campaign websites (Archived)
John Baldacci
Peter Cianchette

Governor
2002
Maine